Becharof National Wildlife Refuge is a National Wildlife Refuge in the Aleutian Range of the Alaska Peninsula of southwestern Alaska. It is adjacent to Katmai National Park and Preserve. It lies primarily in the east-central part of Lake and Peninsula Borough, but extends eastward into the mainland portion of Kodiak Island Borough. The refuge is administered from offices in King Salmon.

History
Jimmy Carter created Becharof National Monument by presidential proclamation on December 1, 1978.  The refuge was established on December 2, 1980 by the Alaska National Interest Land Conservation Act (ANILCA). In 1983, the Fish and Wildlife Service undertook the responsibility to manage the Becharof Refuge, along with the Ugashik and Chignik units of the Alaska Peninsula National Wildlife Refuge.

In 1989 the park areas was heavily affected by the Exxon Valdez Oil Spill which devastated the Alaska Peninsula. Puale Bay was the most heavily oiled bay outside of Prince William Sound.
In an effort to determine species presence, distribution, habitat use, and migratory patterns, extensive land bird studies were conducted from 1995 through 1998 at various locations around Becharof Lake. Biologists continued  the monitoring work in the park 2001 through 2003 using the same methods, paying notable attention to seabird activity, along with caribou and Alaskan moose populations. The refuge is affiliated with the Alaska Fish and Wildlife Cooperative Research Unit at the University of Alaska Fairbanks to conduct research into the drainage basin east of the Ugashik Lakes on the Alaska Peninsula to monitor moose activity.

Landscape and wildlife

It lies on a mountainous coastline containing the Ugashik-Peulik volcano and steep cliffs and the park contains a range of geographical features from mountains, broad valleys and fjords, to tundra and glacially formed lakes. The lake is fed by a number of rivers and streams,  and contains some of the largest salmon populations in the world. The  lake has the world's second largest run of sockeye salmon and estimates reveal that Becharof Lake and its tributaries provide the Bristol Bay fishery alone with six million adult salmon per year. Wildlife is abundant in the park and the high levels of salmon are enough to feed the largest concentrations of brown bears in Alaska. Wolf packs, two species of fox, wolverine, river otter, beaver, caribou, seals, sea lions, sea otters and whales as well as various seabirds such as eagles found along the shore.

The Naknek River basin is one of the important wildlife habitats of the park. The river provides habitat for thousands of ducks, geese and swans that will later populate breeding lakes and ponds on the Alaska Peninsula and the area is closely monitored by biologists and ornithologists. The area contains notable populations of common merganser, common goldeneye, American green-winged teal, Canada goose, greater scaup,  tundra swan, greater white-fronted goose, mallard, northern pintail, American and Eurasian wigeon, northern shoveler,  red-breasted merganser, black scoter, and long-tailed duck.  From mid-March through to mid-May, refuge biologists monitor waterfowl from established points that extend from the mouth of Naknek Lake to Kvichak Bay in Naknek and register the waterfowl by species approximately four times a week.  During winter populations of red-breasted merganser, common goldeneye, bald eagle, willow ptarmigan, glaucous-winged gull, Canada jay, black-billed magpie, common raven,  chickadee, northern shrike, and the common redpoll amongst other birds can be spotted in the park.

References

External links

 Becharof NWR official website
 

Protected areas of Kodiak Island Borough, Alaska
Protected areas of Lake and Peninsula Borough, Alaska
National Wildlife Refuges in Alaska
Protected areas established in 1980
Aleutian Range